Cristina Moros (born February 10, 1977) is an American former professional tennis player.

Moros is originally from Florida and was a world number one junior in doubles. Her father Julio, a Venezuelan by birth, is a tennis coach who was a long time assistant to Nick Bollettieri. She is a goddaughter of Bollettieri.

Between 1994 and 1998, Moros played college tennis for the Texas Longhorns and achieved All-American selection in each of her four seasons. In 1995 she was a member of Texas's NCAA championship winning team. She is currently the head coach of the University of South Florida's women's tennis team.

ITF finals

Doubles: 1 (0–1)

References

External links
 
 

1977 births
Living people
American female tennis players
Texas Longhorns women's tennis players
Tennis people from Florida
American sportspeople of Venezuelan descent